The 1942 South Dakota Coyotes football team was an American football team that represented the University of South Dakota in the North Central Conference (NCC) during the 1942 college football season. In its first and only season under head coach Cletus Clinker, the team compiled a 5–3 record (4–2 against NCC opponents), finished in third place out of nine teams in the NCC, and was outscored by a total of 132 to 116. The team played its home games at Inman Field in Vermillion, South Dakota.

Schedule

References

South Dakota
South Dakota Coyotes football seasons
South Dakota Coyotes football